Edmond Roudnitska (1905–1996) was a French master perfumer and author. He is known for creating perfumes such as Dior's Eau Sauvage and Diorissimo, and Rochas's Femme. Many of his creations are still in production. He was the father of perfumer Michel Roudnitska.

In 1926, he started his training in perfumery in Grasse. In 1942, he met Thérèse Delveaux, who became his wife. In 1946, he founded Art et Parfum, a private lab for creating perfumes.

Diorissimo, based on  lily of the valley, was a notable achievement in the field of perfumery. Unlike rose or jasmine, the smell of lily of the valley cannot be extracted from essential oil of the flower. Roudnitska circumvented the problem by using aroma chemicals like hydroxycitronellal.

For Christian Dior
 Diorama (1948)
 Diorling (1951)
 Eau Fraîche (1955)
 Diorissimo (1956)
 Eau Sauvage (1966)
 Diorella (1972)
 Dior-Dior (1976)

For Elizabeth Arden
 It's You (1939)
 On Dit (1952)
 Elly (1955)
 Arden (1956)

For Hermès
 Eau d'Hermès (1951)
 Grande Eau d'Hermès (1987)
 Hermes Rogue (1988)

For Rochas
 Femme (1944)
 Mousseline (1946)
 Mouche (1947)
 Moustache (1949)
 La Rose (1949)

Other scents
 Le Parfum de Thérèse (early 1950s); rights acquired from Roudnitska's wife Thérèse (for whom it was originally created in the early 1950s) by Frederic Malle, produced from 2000. One of the best chypres with its water fruit accord that was considered way too avant garde and ahead of its time.
 Ocean Rain Mario Valentino®, a male fragrance for Mario Valentino (1990); Roudnitska's last creation
 Cristalle EDT for Chanel, with perfumer Henri Robert.

Published works
 Edmond Rudnitska. Le Parfum. Collection: Que sais-je?. Paris: Presses Universitaires de France - PUF, 1980 (5th edition 2000). 
 Odile Moréno, René Bourdon, Edmond Roudnitska (André Chastel, préface). L'Intimité du Parfum. Paris: Olivier Perrin, 1974. 
 Edmond Rudnitska. Former les Hommes, Mythe ou Réalité?. Paris: Olivier Perrin, 1975. ASIN B0014MHB8W
 L'Esthétique en Question: Introduction à une Esthétique de l'Odorat. Paris: Presses Universitaires de France - PUF. ASIN B0014MG4VM
 Une Vie au Service du Parfum (essays beginning 1938 forward). Paris: Thérèse Vian, 1991.

References

External links
  English Language Works by Perfumer Edmond Roudnitska
 Edmond Roudnitska on scentertainer 

1905 births
1996 deaths
People from Nice
French perfumers
French male writers
Dior people
History of cosmetics
20th-century French male writers